Taito Legends Power-Up is a compilation of classic Taito video games released for the PlayStation Portable system. Patterned after the Taito Memories series for PlayStation 2, Power-Up marks the first release of the franchise on a portable gaming system. The Japanese version is called Taito Memories Pocket and has sixteen games. The western versions remove Rainbow Islands Extra, and replace it with six other games, for a total of 21 games on the western compilation.

Games 
Taito Legends Power-Up features 21 (16 in Japan) different games from Taito's back-catalog of arcade titles. Some of these games have appeared on the Taito Legends console releases, while others are exclusive to Power-Up. These titles include:

Also included are deluxe versions of four games—Balloon Bomber, Cameltry, Crazy Balloon and The Legend of Kage. These versions offer upgraded graphics and extended gameplay.

Taito Legends Power-Up also utilizes the PlayStation Portable's game-sharing feature. Any of the games (original versions only) may be wirelessly transmitted to any other PSP, including those that do not own the full version of the game. Downloaded games remain resident within the PSP's memory until the unit is turned off.

Reception
Taito Legends Power-Up received mixed reviews with an aggregate score of 60.60% on GameRankings. Greg Miller of IGN rated the game 7.2 (decent) for incomplete multiplayer support. Jeff Gerstmann of GameSpot rated the game 6.5 (fair), and criticized the omission of Bubble Bobble and Double Dragon, (the latter was licensed from Technōs Japan for the U.S.), as well as including too many iterations of Space Invaders.

See also
 Taito Memories

References

2006 video games
PlayStation Portable games
PlayStation Portable-only games
Taito games
Taito video game compilations
Square Enix video game compilations
Video games developed in the United Kingdom
Empire Interactive games
Video games developed in Japan